The 2018 Copa Paraguay was the first edition of the Copa Paraguay, Paraguay's domestic football cup competition. The competition ended with Guaraní winning their first title after beating Olimpia 5–3 on penalties in the final following a 2–2 draw. Guaraní, as the winners, were awarded a berth into the 2019 Copa Sudamericana.

Preliminary stage
The preliminary stage was played by teams from the Primera B, Primera C, and the UFI. 7 Primera B teams, 6 Primera C teams, and 7 teams from the UFI qualified for the national stage, for a total of 20 teams.

Primera B
The 17 teams were divided into two groups of four teams each and three groups of three teams. The winners of each group, as well as the two best second-placed teams qualified for the national stage.

Group A

Group B

Group C

Group D

Group E

Ranking of second-placed teams
The two best teams among those ranked second qualified for the national stage. For teams in groups A and B, the matches against the fourth-placed team were not considered in this table.

Primera C
The 13 teams were divided into three groups of three teams each and one group of four teams. The winners of each group, as well as the two best second-placed teams qualified for the national stage.

Group A

Group B

Group C

Group D

Ranking of second-placed teams
The two best teams among those ranked second qualified for the national stage.

UFI
Teams competing in the UFI preliminaries were divided into seven zones grouping the departments of Paraguay, with each department having one participating team (two or three departments per zone). The winners of each zone qualified for the national stage.

Zona 1
This zone included teams from the departments of Concepción, Amambay and Canindeyú.

Zona 2
This zone included teams from the departments of Presidente Hayes, Boquerón and Alto Paraguay.

Zona 3
This zone included teams from the departments of Cordillera and San Pedro.

Zona 4
This zone included teams from the departments of Guairá and Paraguarí.

Zona 5
This zone included teams from the departments of Alto Paraná and Caaguazú.

Zona 6
This zone included teams from the departments of Central, Ñeembucú and Misiones.

Zona 7
This zone included teams from the departments of Itapúa and Caazapá.

National stage

First round
The draw for the first round of the national stage involved the 20 teams which qualified from the preliminary stage, as well as the 12 Primera División teams and the 16 División Intermedia teams, which entered the competition at this stage. The 48 teams were drawn into 24 ties to be played as a single game, with a penalty shootout deciding the winner in case of a tie. The 24 winners will advance to the second round. The draw for the first round was held on 29 June 2018 and the matches were played from 24 July to 5 September 2018.

Second round
The second round was contested by the 24 first round winners. The 12 winners as well as the four losers with the best performance over both rounds qualified for the round of 16. The matches were played from 25 September to 4 October 2018.

Ranking of second round losers
The four teams among the second round losers with the best record in the two previous rounds qualified for the round of 16.

Bracket

Round of 16
The draw for the round of 16 was held on 10 October 2018. The matches were played from 23 to 31 October 2018.

Quarterfinals
Matches were played from 7 to 9 November 2018.

Semifinals
Both semifinal matches were played on 20 November 2018.

Third place play-off

Final

References

External links
Copa Paraguay on the official website of the Paraguayan Football Association 
Copa Paraguay 2018, Soccerway.com

2018 in Paraguayan football
2018 domestic association football cups